The Dodge Charger Daytona SRT is a concept unveiled on August 17, 2022 during the third day of the Dodge Speed Week event in Pontiac, Michigan. It has a new powertrain called the Banshee, which Dodge says acts as the new pinnacle of performance in the Brotherhood of Muscle, eclipsing the Hemi, Hellcat and Redeye engines.

It is set to appear alongside the DeLorean Alpha5 in the Fast X movie. A nearly identical production version is expected to be unveiled closer to 2024.

Overview

Said to preview the brand's electrified future, it features a Fratzonic Chambered exhaust system that can reach , making it as loud as a Hellcat-powered Dodge. The system pushes its sound through an amplifier and tuning chamber located at the rear of the vehicle.

According to Dodge, the new Dodge Charger Daytona SRT is coming in 2024.

References

Charger Daytona SRT